Holos, translated as Voice or Vote, is a liberal and pro-European political party in Ukraine, which was led by Ukrainian musician Svyatoslav Vakarchuk until March 2020. The party won 20 MPs in the 2019 parliamentary election and became part of the opposition in the current Ukrainian parliament. The party split late July 2021 and seven MPs were expelled from the party. As of September 2021, only nine of the party's 20 seats in the Verkhovna Rada are held by MPs who are loyal to the party; the remaining 11 are held by MPs who have formed a breakaway group called Justice (Spravedlyvist).

Name
The name of the party has two meanings in the Ukrainian language - voice and vote. The founder of the party, Svyatoslav Vakarchuk, said that the name of the party was chosen because this word characterizes Ukrainian voters and their desire for change in the country:

History

Establishment and entry to parliament
The party was presented to the public on 16 May 2019 in Kyiv and announced it would run in the upcoming July 2019 Ukrainian parliamentary election. Legally, Holos is an "upgraded" version of the party "Platform of Initiatives" that was founded in 2015 to take part in the 2015 Ukrainian local elections. The creation of the party marks Vakarchuk's second venture into politics – he previously served as an MP for almost a year after being elected in the 2007 Ukrainian parliamentary election.

The party was first featured in the opinion polling carried out from 16 to 21 May 2019, its rating was 4.6%.

The party held its first congress on 8 June 2019, at which part of its party list for the then forthcoming elections was announced. The top 10 candidates were as follows: 1) Svyatoslav Vakarchuk, 2) Yulia Klimenko, 3) Kira Rudyk, 4) Yaroslav Zheleznyak, 5) Oleksandra Ustinova, 6) Oleh Makarov, 7) Yaroslav Yurchyshyn, 8) Serhiy Rakhmanin, 9) Solomiya Bobrovska, and 10) Olha Stefanyshyna. Prior to the congress, the Ukrainian Galician Party and Voice agreed to cooperate, Ukrainian Galician Party members ran as Voice candidates in single-member constituencies and were added to Voice's national electoral list. On 12 June, the party withdrew two of its constituency candidates because they had "affiliated with or co-operated with pro-Russian forces", namely Ukrainian Choice and the Opposition Bloc. Party leader Vakarchuk had assured on 19 May 2019 that no incumbent MPs would be on the party's list for the 2019 parliamentary election. However, such deputies, whose political views coincided with the party's ideology, were allowed to be elected by majority constituencies. In the election, four incumbent MPs stood as candidates for the party in majority constituencies: Victoria Voytsitska, Pavlo Rizanenko, Victoria Ptashnyk, and Leonid Yemets. None of them were elected.

In the 2019 parliamentary election, Voice finished with 5.82% of the vote, 17 MPs elected nationwide and three MPs elected in a constituency. 47.6% of the party's elected deputies are women.

On 11 March 2020, Vakarchuk stepped aside as head of the party. Voice selected Kira Rudyk as its new leader. Vakarchuk left parliament in June 2020, stating that his "mission" (bringing new people with new politics into parliament) was complete.

The party was admitted to the Alliance of Liberals and Democrats for Europe (ALDE) on 18 November 2020.

In the October 2020 Ukrainian local elections, Voice had some local success, having led its factions to the Lviv Oblast Council, to the city councils of Kyiv, Lviv, Cherkasy, and a number of other city councils, including even in the Donbas. The party's mayoral candidate made it to the second round of the election in Cherkasy, which he lost. The party failed to get into the Top-10 of parties that won the most seats in the election (10th place on this list was the Radical Party of Oleh Liashko who won 1.62% of the available seats, which was 535 seats). The party's mayoral candidate for Kyiv, showman Serhiy Prytula, failed to win in the city, coming third with less than 8% of the vote. In June 2021, he quit the party, claiming it had "moved so far away from our initial principles."

In January 2021, the National Agency for Prevention of Corruption (NAPC) blocked the payment of state funds to the party's accounts. The NAPC found agreements and acts of work performed by contractors and the payment of rent for three offices to be illegal.

Disunion
 
In June 2021, 10 of the party's 20 MPs announced that they would create a separate association named Justice (Spravedlyvist) and expressed their lack of confidence in faction leader Yaroslav Zhelezniak. In addition, three of the party's regional branches called on party leader Kira Rudyk to resign and demanded that the party hold a congress to select a new leader. The party responded by admitting that it was "going through a difficult period" and announcing a congress at which the conflict within Voice will be addressed. The split was triggered by the decision of five of the party's MPs (including Rudyk and Zhelezniak) to vote in favour of the ruling party's initiative to delay the introduction of Ukrainian language quotas for the country's film industry; the dissenting MPs called this "betrayal" and a "vote for Russification".

In late July 2021, a group made up of 11 of the party's MPs attempted to replace faction leader Yaroslav Zhelezniak with his deputy, Roman Kostenko, as acting head of the faction. This move failed because for the faction leader to be replaced, firstly two-thirds of the faction have to vote (in this case, 14 MPs), and secondly such a decision can only be made at a faction meeting. A statement countering the attempt was signed by the remaining MPs, including Zhelezniak and Kostenko.

At the party congress of 29 July 2021 it was decided to expel seven of the party MPs. Five of the expelled MPs had already written statements to leave the party. The expelled members were dissatisfied with, according to them, the "cementing of Kira Rudyk's control over the party." At the same meeting, 86% of the delegates expressed their confidence in Rudyk as the party leader.

As of September 2021, only nine of the party's 20 seats in the Verkhovna Rada (Ukraine's national parliament) are held by MPs who are loyal to the party; the remaining 11 are held by MPs who are part of Spravedlyvist.

On 15 December 2021, Voice lost its appeal to the Supreme Court of Ukraine to roll back the January 2021 blocking of the payment of state funds to the party's accounts by the National Agency for Prevention of Corruption (NAPC). The court verdict remanded the case for retrial, but allowed the NAPC to continue blocking the funds.

Criminal case 
On 2 February 2022, party leader Kira Rudyk stated that a criminal case had been opened against the party regarding its economic activities. In comments on the party's official site Rudyk stated that the case was politically motivated, and that Ukraine's State Bureau of Investigation was "systematically attempting to muzzle those who criticise the government while ignoring cases involving 'Ze-friends'".

Political positions
The party declares a democratic approach, supporting the separation of money from politics. In economic matters, the party is in favor of introducing a tax on withdrawn capital, a land market, privatization of state-owned enterprises, and the fight against illegal customs and tax schemes.

Party leader Vakarchuk stated on 10 June 2019 that the party wants to abolish the current Ukrainian election constituencies (in which 225 seats are elected in constituencies with a first-past-the-post electoral system in one round), instead favoring a shift to full open list proportional representation.

According to the analysis of human rights activist Volodymyr Yavorsky, the party's program pays great attention to human rights, while there are no populist statements in it.

According to experts from the Center for Economic Strategy Dmytro Yablonovsky and Daria Mikhailishin, the program focuses on combating corruption through de-oligarchization and by increasing the efficiency of the state through the introduction of modern technologies.

In November 2019, the party's parliamentary faction stated that because Ukraine could not regain control of separatist Donetsk People's Republic and Luhansk People's Republic and Russian annexed Crimea it should "freeze the conflicts", abandon the Minsk Agreements and focus on strengthening its own positions.

In October 2020, the party claimed that Russia must pay $500 bln in reparations to cover the damage it has caused to the Donbas since 2014.

Leadership

Party Leaders

Faction Leaders

Prominent party members 

 Inna Sovsun, Member of Ukraine Parliament, Deputy Head of Holos party, First Deputy Minister of Education and Science from 2014 to 2016, vice-president of the Kyiv School of Economics from 2016 to 2018, co-founder and former director of the think tank CEDOS, professor of the department of political science National University of Kyiv-Mohyla Academy and Kyiv School of Economics
 Pavlo Kukhta, program director of the party
Serhiy Rakhmanin, journalist and TV presenter
Yuri Sokolov, cardiologist and doctor of medical sciences
Lesia Vasylenko, human rights activist and founder of the Legal Hundred
Oleksandra Ustinova
 Yaroslav Zhelezniak, Government Relations Advisor
A number of prominent party members were excluded from the party in July 2021 due to their disagreement with the party's leadership.

Electoral performance

Verkhovna Rada

See also
:Category:Voice (Ukrainian political party) politicians

Notes

References

External links

2019 establishments in Ukraine
Anti-corruption parties in Ukraine
Centrist parties in Ukraine
E-democracy
Liberal parties in Ukraine
Parliamentary factions in Ukraine
Political parties established in 2019
Pro-European political parties in Ukraine